Beachworld is a short science fiction story by Stephen King, first published in Weird Tales in 1984, and collected in King's 1985 collection Skeleton Crew.

Plot summary

Beachworld is set at an unspecified time in the distant future. Among the few clues to the date is the passing reference that the last of the Beach Boys had died eight thousand years previously.

The catastrophic crash-landing of a Federation spacecraft on an uncharted planet made up entirely of sand leaves one crewman, Grimes, dead while Rand and Shapiro survive. Rand stares out over the sand dunes as both men associate the endless rolling dunes with a beach. Rand becomes hypnotized by the dunes and refuses to move from the very spot he's standing on or drink water. Shapiro also feels drawn to the dunes but, unlike Rand, finds this hypnosis frightening and is relieved to go inside their ship where the dunes are out of sight. When a trader spacecraft arrives in response to Shapiro's beacon, the crew initially treat Shapiro's account with skepticism. However, they become convinced when they're unable to get Rand away from the dunes.

Rand resists leaving the planet, and the sand reveals itself to be sentient. It prevents Rand's rescue by damaging a sampler android sent from the ship and sending a hand of sand up to stop a tranquilizer dart. The rescue ship escapes just in time, with Shapiro and the trader's captain both narrowly avoiding a giant hand of sand. Rand, left alone, stares up at the ship as it disappears, and then begins to pile handfuls of sand into his mouth.

Adaptations

Short animated film by Maria Ivanova. It was screened on several film festivals. Only the trailer is available on the internet (due to the Dollar Baby contract) . It is the first official Russian Dollar Baby. It was made by one person: Maria directed it and animated.  

In February 2012, filmmaker Christian Skibinski acquired the rights to adapt "'Beachworld'" into an animated short film, which was scheduled to be released later that year.

A live action version of Beachworld was released in 2015.

A Dollar Baby version of Beachworld from OneNinth & Pointed Pictures premiered online in 2021 as part of the Stephen King Rules Dollar Baby Film Festival.

See also
 Stephen King short fiction bibliography
 The Invisible Enemy (The Outer Limits)

References

External links
 

Short stories by Stephen King
1985 short stories
Short stories adapted into films
Science fiction short stories
Works originally published in Weird Tales